Palos Verdes Estates (Palos Verdes, Spanish for "Green Sticks")  is a city in Los Angeles County, California, United States, situated on the Palos Verdes Peninsula. The city was master-planned by the noted American landscape architect and planner Frederick Law Olmsted Jr. The city is located along the Southern California coastline of the Pacific Ocean.

The population was 13,347 at the 2020 census, a slight decrease from its  2010 population of 13,438. Palos Verdes Estates is one of the wealthiest cities in the United States. The 90274 ZIP code (covering the cities of Palos Verdes Estates and Rolling Hills) was ranked the 47th most expensive housing area among high property value U.S. ZIP codes in a 2007 study by Forbes.com. Palos Verdes is also known for its high-performing schools; its high school has been regularly ranked among the top 50 nationally by various publications.

History

Frank Vanderlip established both a land syndicate holding the Palos Verdes peninsula, and a real estate development trust for the Palos Verdes Estates subdivision. The Commonwealth Trust Company filed the Palos Verdes Protective Restrictions in Los Angeles County in 1923. These restrictions established rules for the developer and all land owners. The developer was required to set aside half of the land for common use, including roads and parks, but also to build bridle paths, a golf course, and retain several miles of coastline free of development. No less than ninety percent of the remaining land was required to be used for single-family homes.

The designers of Palos Verdes Estates, Frederick Law Olmsted Jr. and Charles Cheney, used deed restrictions as a method of controlling development of the subdivision, even after many of the lots would have already been sold. The deed restrictions prohibited nuisance businesses, such as polluting industries, but also bars and cemeteries. The deed restrictions also included an exclusionary racial covenant which forbid an owner from selling or renting a house to anyone who wasn't Caucasian. They were also not permitted to have African-Americans on their property with the exception of chauffeurs, gardeners, and domestic servants. The “sundown rule” was strictly in effect, and it wasn’t until 1948 when such restrictions were declared unconstitutional. Yet, it took 20 more years until the Fair Housing Act was passed in 1968 for the reality of the civil rights protections to take hold. An art jury reviewed all building plans, regulating any structure in regard to style, material, and even small details like color and the pitch of the roof. The construction of fences and hedges were subject to evaluation by the art jury.

The city's oldest building is La Venta Inn built in 1923 as a sales office for Vanderlip and his business associates. Other buildings were erected mostly around the shopping area in Malaga Cove. Palos Verdes Estates was finally incorporate in 1939. The Malaga Cove Plaza building of the Palos Verdes Public Library, designed by Pasadena architect Myron Hunt, was placed on the National Register of Historic Places in 1995.

Geography
Palos Verdes Estates is located at  (33.787049, -118.396657).

Demographics

2010

The 2010 United States Census reported that Palos Verdes Estates had a population of 13,438. The racial makeup of Palos Verdes Estates was 10,346 (77.0%) White (73.4% Non-Hispanic White), 161 (1.2%) African American, 21 (0.2%) Native American, 2,322 (17.3%) Asian, 8 (0.1%) Pacific Islander, 94 (0.7%) from other races, and 486 (3.6%) from two or more races. There were 631 people (4.7%) of  Hispanic or Latino origin, of any race.

The Census reported that 13,421 people (99.9% of the population) lived in households, 17 (0.1%) lived in non-institutionalized group quarters, and 0 (0%) were institutionalized.

There were 5,066 households, out of which 1,686 (33.3%) had children under the age of 18 living in them, 3,649 (72.0%) were opposite-sex married couples living together, 296 (5.8%) had a female householder with no husband present, 138 (2.7%) had a male householder with no wife present.  There were 91 (1.8%) unmarried opposite-sex partnerships, and 26 (0.5%) same-sex married couples or partnerships. 848 households (16.7%) were made up of individuals, and 534 (10.5%) had someone living alone who was 65 years of age or older. The average household size was 2.65.  There were 4,083 families (80.6% of all households); the average family size was 2.97.

The population was spread out, with 3,113 people (23.2%) under the age of 18, 588 people (4.4%) aged 18 to 24, 1,787 people (13.3%) aged 25 to 44, 4,702 people (35.0%) aged 45 to 64, and 3,248 people (24.2%) who were 65 years of age or older.  The median age was 49.9 years. For every 100 females, there were 95.2 males.  For every 100 females age 18 and over, there were 93.0 males.

The homeowner vacancy rate was 0.7%; the rental vacancy rate was 5.6%.  11,958 people (89.0% of the population) lived in owner-occupied housing units and 1,463 people (10.9%) lived in rental housing units.

According to the 2010-2014 U.S. Census, the median income for a household in Palos Verdes Estates was $171,328. The per capita income for the city was $87,408.

2000
As of the census of 2000, there were 13,340 people, 4,993 households, and 4,119 families residing in the city. The population density was 2,784.9 inhabitants per square mile (1,075.3/km2). The racial makeup of the city was 78.3% White, 17.1% Asian, 2.0% African American, 0.1% Native American, 0.1% Pacific Islander, 0.6% from other races, and 2.7% from two or more races. Hispanic or Latino of any race were 2.8% of the population.

There were 4,993 households, out of which 32.8% had children under the age of 18 living with them, 75.7% were married couples living together, 4.7% had a female householder with no husband present, and 17.5% were non-families. 15.0% of all households were made up of individuals, and 8.2% had someone living alone who was 65 years of age or older.  The average household size was 2.67 and the average family size was 2.96.

In the city, the population was spread out, with 23.2% under the age of 18, 4.1% from 18 to 24, 19.8% from 25 to 44, 33.0% from 45 to 64, and 19.9% who were 65 years of age or older.  The median age was 47 years. For every 100 females, there were 96.1 males.  For every 100 females age 18 and over, there were 92.8 males.

Government and infrastructure

Public safety
Palos Verdes Estates is the only city on the Palos Verdes Peninsula to have its own police department (the other three peninsula cities contract with the Los Angeles County Sheriff's Department, using the station in nearby Lomita). The department currently has 25 officers. These officers are assigned to different divisions such as traffic, patrol and detectives. The city also has its own dispatch center and jail. Both are staffed 24 hours a day.

Fire prevention and Paramedic response services are provided by the Los Angeles County Fire Department with engine company firehouse facilities located within the city limits.

It is the home of the Lunada Bay Boys surf gang which has been subject to several lawsuits over the past years and much publicity.

The Los Angeles County Department of Health Services operates the Torrance Health Center in Harbor Gateway, Los Angeles, near Torrance and serving Palos Verdes Estates.

County, state, and federal representation

The United States Postal Service Palos Verdes Estates Post Office is located in Suite 102 at 2516 Via Tejon.

Education

Primary and secondary schools

Public schools
The city is served by the Palos Verdes Peninsula Unified School District. A previous The Washington Post study ranked the nearby Palos Verdes Peninsula High School (the "Panthers"; enrollment 2,400) as the # 8 best among public and private high schools in the United States. U.S. News & World Report recently academically ranks it # 89 among 18,500 U.S. high schools, and Newsweek ranks it # 146. In 2014, thedailybeast.com ranked the two area high schools as the 44th and 121st best high schools in the country.

Palos Verdes Peninsula High School also annually honors the largest collection of National Merit Scholar recipients (usually 50–60) enrolled in a U.S. high school in any year.  In any given year there is routinely a dozen-way or more tie for the valedictorian (highest grade point average) honors in the graduating class.  The smaller enrollment Palos Verdes High School (the "Sea Kings"; enrollment 1,900) achieved the same API score as Palos Verdes Peninsula High School (898).  Both schools' students and faculties in science and computer science curricula are participants in national robotic engineering advancement, and have competed against universities (Caltech, Stanford, Princeton, Cornell) and defense contractor firms in government-sponsored robotic science application challenges (example:  The Sea Kings competed in the 2005 DARPA Grand Challenge; the only U.S. high school to do so).

Public school-enrollment students can attend either Palos Verdes High School in Palos Verdes Estates (Lunada Bay), or the larger Palos Verdes Peninsula High School, in adjacent Rolling Hills Estates.  Prior to 2002, students were only offered to attend Palos Verdes Peninsula High School, as the Palos Verdes High School, originally built as a high school, had been designated an intermediate school as student enrollments declined in 1970–1990s.  In 2002 Palos Verdes High School was recommissioned as a high school again to accommodate the recent growth in student enrollments across the entire Palos Verdes Peninsula.  The student enrollment growth has occurred as original homeowner-retirees have sold their homes over the recent years to younger families, and moved to smaller senior citizen housing on the peninsula or elsewhere.

Private schools
Chadwick School is another well known school in the area.  It is a K-12 independent, nonsectarian school which was established in 1935.

In 1992 the International Bilingual School, a Japanese preparatory school for grades K-9, moved to Palos Verdes Estates. By 2002 the PVUSD had filed suit to force the International Bilingual School to leave the property that the school was located in. The PVUSD owned the school building.

Public libraries
The Palos Verdes Library District operates the Malaga Cove Library in Palos Verdes Estates.

Notable people
 Matt Barnes (born 1980) – Forward for the Golden State Warriors (born in Santa Clara, California)
 Chester Bennington (1976–2017)  – Musician and lead singer of Linkin Park (Originally from Phoenix, Arizona)
 David Benoit (born 1953) – Musician (born in Bakersfield, California)
 Robert DeLeo (born 1966) – Bassist and co-founder of Stone Temple Pilots (Originally from Montclair, New Jersey)
 Bill Laimbeer (born 1957) – American basketball player (Detroit Pistons) - Originally from Boston, Massachusetts
 Daniel Levitin (born 1957) – Best-selling author, neuroscientist, musician (born in San Francisco, California)
 Matt Manfredi (born 1971) - American screenwriter (born and raised in Palos Verdes Estates) 
 Randy Nauert (born 1945) – Bassist and co-founder of The Challengers (born and raised in Palos Verdes Estates) 
 Donald Peterman (1932–2011) – Academy Award-nominated cinematographer (born in Los Angeles, California)
 Christen Press (born 1988) – American soccer forward and World Cup champion (born in Los Angeles, California)
 Shahbudin Rahimtoola (1931–2018) – Cardiologist (Originally from Bombay, India)
 Anderson Silva (born 1975) – UFC Middleweight Champion (Originally from São Paulo, SP, Brazil)
 Gary Wright (born 1943) – Musician (Originally from Cresskill, New Jersey)

References

External links

1939 establishments in California
Cities in Los Angeles County, California
Incorporated cities and towns in California
Palos Verdes Peninsula
Populated coastal places in California
Populated places established in 1939
South Bay, Los Angeles
Sundown towns in California